Lieutenant Frederic Brooks Dugdale VC (21 October 1877 – 13 November 1902) was an English British Army officer and recipient of the Victoria Cross, the highest and most prestigious award for gallantry in the face of the enemy that can be awarded to British and Commonwealth forces.

Biography
Dugdale was born in 1877, the youngest son of Colonel James Dugdale, of Sezincot, Moreton in the Marsh, Gloucestershire. He was commissioned into the British Army as a second-lieutenant in the 5th Lancers in October 1899. The outbreak of the Second Boer War the same month saw the regiment sent to South Africa, where they took part in the Ladysmith Relief Column. He was promoted to the rank of lieutenant in May 1900.

He was 23 years old serving during the Second Boer War when the following deed took place on 3 March 1901 near Derby, South Africa for which he was awarded the Victoria Cross.

He had a severe attack of enteric fever, and after his recovery served with General John French in the Cape Colony. Staying with his regiment in South Africa until the war ended in May 1902, he then left for the United Kingdom on the SS Briton two months later. Shortly after his return, he was killed in a horse riding accident whilst riding with the North Cotswold Hounds, near Charingworth, Gloucestershire, England, on 13 November 1902. He was buried at Longborough, near Moreton in Marsh.

The medal
His Victoria Cross is displayed at The Royal Lancers and Nottinghamshire Yeomanry Museum, Thoresby Park, Nottinghamshire, England.

See also 
 List of horse accidents

References

Monuments to Courage (David Harvey, 1999)
The Register of the Victoria Cross (This England, 1997)
Victoria Crosses of the Anglo-Boer War (Ian Uys, 2000)

External links
Location of grave and VC medal (Gloucestershire)
Brief biography
Biography from angloboerwar.com

1877 births
1902 deaths
People from Burnley
Deaths by horse-riding accident in England
5th Royal Irish Lancers officers
Second Boer War recipients of the Victoria Cross
British recipients of the Victoria Cross
People educated at Marlborough College
Alumni of Christ Church, Oxford
British Army personnel of the Second Boer War
British Army recipients of the Victoria Cross
Road incident deaths in England